Labeobarbus surkis is a species of cyprinid fish that is endemic to Lake Tana and associated rivers in Ethiopia.

References 

Endemic fauna of Ethiopia
surkis
Taxa named by Eduard Rüppell
Fish described in 1835
Fish of Lake Tana